Ungmennafélagið Sindri, commonly known as Sindri, is an Icelandic multi-sports club from the town of Höfn located on the east coast of Iceland. It fields departments in basketball, football, gymnastics, swimming, track & field and volleyball.

Basketball

Men's basketball

History
After a hiatus, Sindri's basketball department was re-started in 2005 with the arrival of Arnar Guðjónsson and Skúli Ingibergur Þórarinsson. On April 14, 2018, Sindri won Division II and achieved promotion to Division I. In May 2018, the club hired Mike Smith, the former assistant coach of the Luxembourg men's national basketball team, as their head coach. On 1 February 2019, the team parted ways with Smith after the team winning only 1 if its 15 games. Skúli Ingibergur Þórarinsson took over from Smith on interim basis. In June 2021 the club hired former Úrvalsdeild Karla Coach of the Year Israel Martín as head coach.

Trophies and achievements
Division II
 Winners (1): 2018
Division III
 Winners (1): 2017

Notable players
 Andrée Michelsson
 Gerald Robinson
 Ivan Delgado

Coaches
 Arnar Guðjónsson 2005–2007
 Yima Chia-Kur 2017
 Hallmar Hallsson 2017–2018
 Mike Smith 2018–2019
 Skúli Ingibergur Þórarinsson  2019
 Halldór Steingrímsson  2019–2020
 Pedro Garcia Rosado 2020–2021
 Israel Martín 2021–present

Women's basketball
Sindri women's team currently played in 2. deild kvenna during the 2018–2019 season.

Football

Sindri's men's team currently plays in 2. deild karla while its women's team plays in 1. deild kvenna.

Men's football

Trophies and achievements
Division III
 Winners (3): 1998, 2012, 2022
 Runner-up (1): 2005

References

External links
 Official Website
 Football profile at ksi.is

 
1934 establishments in Iceland
Football clubs in Iceland
Basketball teams in Iceland
Association football clubs established in 1934